RG2 may refer to:
 1983 RG2 (aka 10482 Dangrieser), a Main-belt asteroid
 a United Kingdom postcode covering the Reading area

Rg2 or rg2 may refer to :
 Ginsenoside Rg2, a bioactive molecule
 a chess move of a rook to g2

RG-II may refer to :
 Rhamnogalacturonan II, a type of pectin